Macdonaldtown is an urban place in Sydney, in the state of New South Wales, Australia. It is 4 kilometres south-west of the Sydney central business district, adjacent to the suburbs of Newtown, Eveleigh and Erskineville. Macdonaldtown is part of the local government area of the City of Sydney and informally part of the region of the Inner West. The locality is around Macdonaldtown railway station, on the Inner West line of the Sydney Trains network.

History
Macdonaldtown, the whole suburb, was incorporated as a local government area in 1872 and was renamed as Erskineville in 1893.

References
The Book of Sydney Suburbs, Compiled by Frances Pollen, Angus & Robertson Publishers, 1990, Published in Australia

External links 
 Macdonaldtown Geographical Names Board of New South Wales

Sydney localities